Prigorodnaya Slobodka is a rural locality in Gorodensky Selsoviet Rural Settlement, Lgovsky District, Kursk Oblast, Russia. Population:

Geography 
The village is located on the Seym River, 53 km from the Russia–Ukraine border, 61 km west of Kursk, 1 km north-east of the district center – the town Lgov, 4 km from the selsoviet center – Gorodensk.

 Climate
Prigorodnaya Slobodka has a warm-summer humid continental climate (Dfb in the Köppen climate classification).

Transport 
Prigorodnaya Slobodka is located 7.5 km from the road of regional importance  (Kursk – Lgov – Rylsk – border with Ukraine) as part of the European route E38, on the road  (38K-017 – Lgov), on the road of intermunicipal significance  (Lgov – Gorodensk – Borisovka – Rechitsa), 3 km from the nearest railway station Sherekino (railway line Navlya – Lgov-Kiyevsky).

The rural locality is situated 68 km from Kursk Vostochny Airport, 145 km from Belgorod International Airport and 271 km from Voronezh Peter the Great Airport.

References

Notes

Sources

Rural localities in Lgovsky District